The Grotrian Baronetcy, of Leighton Buzzard in the County of Bedford, is a title in the Baronetage of the United Kingdom. It was created on 28 June 1934 for Herbert Brent Grotrian, who had earlier represented Kingston upon Hull South West in the House of Commons as a Conservative. He was the second son of Frederick Brent Grotrian, Conservative member of parliament for Kingston upon Hull East from 1886 to 1892.

Grotrian baronets, of Leighton Buzzard (1934)
Sir Herbert Brent Grotrian, 1st Baronet (1870–1951)
Sir Joseph Appelbe Brent Grotrian, 2nd Baronet (1904–1984)
Sir (Philip) Christian Brent Grotrian, 3rd Baronet (born 1935)

Notes

References
Kidd, Charles, Williamson, David (editors). Debrett's Peerage and Baronetage (1990 edition). New York: St Martin's Press, 1990, 

Grotrian